is a Japanese stage performer and tarento. She is represented with Yoshimoto Creative Agency in Osaka. Her husband is Ponta Dohi.

Filmography

Internet videos
 Former

 Current

Television
 Current

 Former

Radio
 Former

DVD

Stage

References

External links
 
Yoshimoto Shinkigeki Takiko Fukuda no –Takiko Aji gohan– (Internet Archive; new blog launched based on her old blog on Yahoo! Blog) 

1984 births
Actors from Nara Prefecture
Japanese television personalities
Living people